The 2013–14 Irish Premier League season was the 41st running of Basketball Ireland's premier men's basketball competition. The season featured 10 teams from across the Republic of Ireland and Northern Ireland, with the regular season beginning on 5 October 2013 and ending on 9 March 2014. With a first-place finish and a 17–1 win–loss record, Killester were crowned league champions for the eighth time in their history. UCC Demons were crowned National Cup champions for a sixth time, and won the season finale Champions Trophy tournament for the second straight year.

Teams

Regular season

Standings

Source: Comortais

Champions Trophy

Bracket

*National League Division 1 champions.

**Fourth place in National League Division 1.

Quarter-finals

Semi-finals

Final

National Cup

Round 1 (2 legs)

Round 2 (1 leg)
Winner of Series 1 vs Winner of Series 2

Semi-finals
Winner of Series 3 vs Winner of Series 5

Winner of Series 4 vs Winner of Round 2

Final

Source: Comortais

Premier League Select Team

Gathering Shield
The 2013 "Gathering Shield" match between the Premier League Select Team and the Welsh National Select Team took place at the National Basketball Arena on Saturday 26 October.

Team
Shane Coughlan (UCC Demons)
Niall O'Reilly (UCC Demons)
Colin O'Reilly (UCC Demons)
Mike McGinn (Neptune)
Ger Noonan (Neptune)
Mati Rudak (Neptune)
Neil Campbell (UL Eagles)
Scott Kinnevane (UL Eagles)
Keith Anderson (Swords Thunder – National League Division 1)
Isaac Westbrooks (Killester)
Mindaugas Tamušauskas (Dublin Inter)
Paul O'Brien (Moycullen)

Head Coach: Mark Keenan (UL Eagles)
Assistant Coaches: Jerome Westbrooks (Killester) and Mike Hickey (UL Eagles)

Game data

Ireland vs England
For the second straight year, the Premier League Select Team travelled to Birmingham, England to play against the England Select Team in the BBL Cup Final curtain-raiser. The match took place at the National Indoor Arena on Sunday 12 January, with tip off at 12pm.

Team
Paul Dick (Belfast Star)
Darren Townes (Neptune)
Ger Noonan (Neptune)
Ian McLoughlin (Neptune)
Michael McGinn (Neptune)
Ciaran O'Sullivan (UCC Demons)
Mārtiņš Provisors (DCU Saints)
Kieran O'Brien (Killester)
Mike Westbrooks (Killester)
Dylan Cunningham (Moycullen)
Delwan Graham (UL Eagles)
Scott Kinnevane (UL Eagles)

Head Coach: Mark Keenan (UL Eagles)
Assistant Coaches: Jerome Westbrooks (Killester) and Mike Hickey (UL Eagles)
Team Manager: Aidan O'Brien

Game data

Awards

Player of the Month

Coach of the Month

Statistics leaders
Stats as of the end of the regular season

Regular season
 Player of the Year: Michael Bonaparte (Killester)
 U23 Player of the Year: Paul Dick (Belfast Star)
 Coach of the Year: Jonathan Grennell (Killester)

References

Irish
Super League (Ireland) seasons
Basket
Basket